The 40th General Assembly of Prince Edward Island was in session from March 12, 1924, to June 2, 1927. The Conservative Party led by James David Stewart formed the government.

Louis L. Jenkins was elected speaker.

There were four sessions of the 40th General Assembly:

Members

Kings

Prince

Queens

Notes:

References
  Election results for the Prince Edward Island Legislative Assembly, 1923-07-26
 O'Handley, Kathryn Canadian Parliamentary Guide, 1994 

Terms of the General Assembly of Prince Edward Island
1924 establishments in Prince Edward Island
1927 disestablishments in Prince Edward Island